Parlow is a surname. Notable people with the surname include:

Cindy Parlow Cone (born 1978), American soccer executive and president of the United States Soccer Federation
Frank Parlow (born 1967), German former yacht racer
Kathleen Parlow (1890–1963), Canadian violinist
Maida Parlow French, Canadian author and artist
Matthew J. Parlow, Dean of Chapman University School of Law

See also 
Parlov